Ku Chin-shui (15 January 1960 – 25 May 2016) was an Amis Taiwanese decathlete and pole vaulter. He medaled for Chinese Taipei at the Asian Athletics Championships six times, winning one gold medal, two silver medals, and three bronze medals. At the 1990 Asian Games, he earned a silver medal in the decathlon. Upon retiring from athletics, he became a physical education teacher.

Post-athletic life
On 24 August 1999, an explosion on board a landed Uni Air plane, Flight 873, injured 28 people and killed Ku Jing-chi (C: 古金池, P: Gǔ Jīnchí), the older brother of Ku Chin-shui. 

A report from the Aviation Safety Council (ASC) stated that the cause of the fire was the interaction of two luggage items that happened to be in overhead compartments. Firstly, gasoline had leaked from a plastic bottle and, secondly, a motorcycle battery had been jostled, causing an electric arc that ignited fumes from the gasoline. 

Prosecutors accused Ku Chin-shui of asking his nephew to take gasoline on the flight. Ku was convicted and sentenced to ten years in prison. Upon appeal, the sentence was shortened to seven and a half years. After a fifth retrial, he was declared not guilty. The ASC had commissioned an analysis from the Chungshan Institute of Science and Technology, which said the ASC's simulation environment differed from that of the aircraft which had exploded."

The court case caused Ku to lose his teaching position, and he worked part-time at a steel factory until 2008, when he returned to teaching full-time.

Ku was diagnosed with cancer in 2014 and died of plasma cell leukemia on 25 May 2016 at National Taiwan University Hospital in Taipei. Aged 56 at the time of his death, Ku is survived by his wife and two children.

International competitions

 This performance was calculated using the 1977 IAAF scoring tables and in the modern 1985 IAAF tables, is worth 7614 points

See also
List of Asian Games medalists in athletics
Uni Air Flight 873, the related aircraft accident

References

External links

1960 births
2016 deaths
People from Hualien County
Taiwanese decathletes
Taiwanese male pole vaulters
Taiwanese male athletes
Olympic decathletes
Olympic athletes of Taiwan
Athletes (track and field) at the 1984 Summer Olympics
Asian Games silver medalists for Chinese Taipei
Asian Games medalists in athletics (track and field)
Athletes (track and field) at the 1990 Asian Games
Medalists at the 1990 Asian Games
National Taiwan Normal University alumni
Amis people
Taiwanese schoolteachers
Taiwanese prisoners and detainees
Prisoners and detainees of Taiwan
Deaths from cancer in Taiwan
Deaths from leukemia